This is a list of people noted for their contribution to gardening, either by working as gardeners or garden designers, or by commissioning famous gardens. 

It does not include the innumerable people who count gardening among their hobbies.

Notable gardeners
The list follows gardeners or garden designers by occupation. It includes garden designers and landscape gardeners involved chiefly in garden design, and expert writers or broadcasters on the subject.

People commissioning notable gardens
Other people whose primary profession was not gardening have made notable contributions to horticulture by planning or commissioning significant gardens. 

Michael Heseltine, 20th-century English politician, noted arboriculturist
Thomas Jefferson, 19th-century American president, recognized for planning the grounds of the University of Virginia
Lucullus, 1st-century BC Roman general, noted for laying out the Gardens of Lucullus
Nebuchadnezzar II, 6th-century neo-Babylonian king, credited with founding the Hanging Gardens of Babylon
Vita Sackville-West, English author, gardening columnist, creator of Sissinghurst Castle Garden in Kent
William Shenstone, 18th-century English practitioner of landscape gardening through development of his estate
Solomon, Biblical king recorded as creating gardens, possibly near Etam

Fictional gardeners
Agent 47, became a gardener in Sicily after he temporarily retired from being a hitman in Hitman 2: Silent Assassin
Pat, the White Rabbit's gardener in Alice's Adventures in Wonderland
Mr. McGregor, the elderly gardener in three children's books by Beatrix Potter: The Tale of Peter Rabbit, The Tale of Benjamin Bunny, and The Tale of the Flopsy Bunnies.
Boothby, recurring character in Star Trek, groundskeeper of Starfleet Academy 
Chance the Gardener in the film Being There, a simple American whose name is misheard as "Chauncey Gardiner" and accidentally becomes a Presidential advisor and candidate
Samwise Gamgee in The Lord of the Rings, a hobbit, the servant and companion of Frodo Baggins, the Ring-bearer
Tom and Barbara Good in 1975 TV series The Good Life, a middle-class English couple who try to become self-sufficient on the produce of their garden in Surbiton
Souseiseki and Suiseiseki in the manga and anime Rozen Maiden, referred to as gardeners for their ability to tend not only plants but also the "soul trees" of humans
The Chief Gardener of the Imperial Palace Grounds was a key figure on Trantor, the galactic capitol in Isaac Asimov's Foundation series – a high functionary with a palatial office in the enormous Imperial complex and "an army of men and women under him"
There are multiple gardeners, botanists and herbologists in the Harry Potter series:
Pomona Sprout and Herbert Beery, Herbology teachers
Frank Bryce, the Riddles' gardener
Miranda Goshawk (in the film version) and Phyllida Spore, two authors
Elladora Ketteridge and Beaumont Majoribanks, discovered gillyweed, a fictional plant
Hadrian Whittle, named after a real-life garden designer
Rubeus Hagrid, gameskeeper, Keeper of Keys and Grounds at Hogwarts

See also

Celebrity gardener
List of gardening topics
List of landscape architects

References

Gardener
Gardener